Indra Bagus Ade Chandra (born 13 July 1987) is an Indonesian badminton player who later represented Italy. He is currently the coach of the Belgium national badminton team.

Achievements

BWF International Challenge/Series (4 titles, 6 runners-up) 
Men's singles

  BWF International Challenge tournament
  BWF International Series tournament
  BWF Future Series tournament

References

External links 
 

1987 births
Living people
Sportspeople from Jakarta
Indonesian male badminton players
Indonesian expatriate sportspeople in Italy
Italian people of Indonesian descent
Italian male badminton players
Indonesian expatriate sportspeople in Belgium